Maling station is a station of Line 9 and Line 10 of the Shenzhen Metro. Line 9 platforms opened on 28 October 2016 and Line 10 platforms opened on 18 August 2020.

Station layout

Exits

References

Shenzhen Metro stations
Railway stations in Guangdong
Futian District
Railway stations in China opened in 2016